Fouad Sedki (24 October 1925 – 12 January 1996) was an Egyptian footballer. He competed at the 1948 Summer Olympics and the 1952 Summer Olympics.

References

External links
 
 
 

1925 births
1996 deaths
Egyptian footballers
Egypt international footballers
Olympic footballers of Egypt
Footballers at the 1948 Summer Olympics
Footballers at the 1952 Summer Olympics
1963 African Cup of Nations managers
Footballers from Cairo
Association football defenders
Al Ahly SC players
Egyptian football managers
Egypt national football team managers